The Shire of Calliope was a local government area in the Capricornia region of Queensland, Australia. It was centred on the town of Calliope.

History

Calliope Division was created on 11 November 1879 as one of 74 divisions around Queensland under the Divisional Boards Act 1879 with a population of 1044.

On 7 January 1902 part of Calliope Division was separated to create Miriam Vale Division.

With the passage of the Local Authorities Act 1902, Calliope Division became the Shire of Calliope on 31 March 1903.

In 1927, the council hall was in Gladstone.

Following the report of the Local Government Reform Commission released in July 2007, three former local government areas:
 City of Gladstone
 Shire of Calliope
 Shire of Miriam Vale
were amalgamated to form Gladstone Region on 15 March 2008.

Towns and localities
The Shire of Calliope included the following settlements:

Towns:
 Calliope (administrative centre)

Urban areas:
 Benaraby
 Boyne Island
 Tannum Sands

Rural townships:
 Ambrose
 Mount Larcom
 Raglan
 Yarwun
 Targinnie

Localities of The Boyne Valley:
 Builyan
 Many Peaks
 Nagoorin
 Ubobo

Other communities:
 Bracewell
 East End

Chairpersons and mayors
 1927: Frank Butler
1991 - 1995: Liz Cunningham
 1995 - 2008: George Creed

References

External links
 University of Queensland: Queensland Places: Calliope Shire
 

Former local government areas of Queensland
2008 disestablishments in Australia
Populated places disestablished in 2008